Gregory Junior Nwokolo (born 3 January 1986) is a professional footballer who last played as a forward for Madura United. Born in Nigeria, he represented Indonesia at international level.

Club career 
Greg began his career in Asia with Tampines Rovers. After that, in 2004 he signed for Young Lions. He left them in the same year to move to the Indonesian club, Persijatim Solo. After half a year in Indonesia for Persijatim, he joined Singapore Armed Forces FC in January 2005 and signed back to PSIS Semarang in early 2006.

After a year and a half, in mid-2006 he joined PSMS Medan. He played for PSMS Medan one year before being signed in January 2007 for Persis Solo, after 14 goals in 28 games in the 2007–08 season was sold to Persija Jakarta.

In 2009, he left the club, Persija Jakarta and he want to seek his fortune in Europe and signed for the Portuguese club, S.C. Olhanense until 30 June 2010, in August 2010 before he moved back to Persija Jakarta as a free agent.

In the 2011–12 season, he was recruited by Pelita Jaya together with Safee Sali and Aleksandar Bajevski. After that, Greg moved to Arema Indonesia for the 2012–13 season.

On 5 December 2014, he signed again with Persija Jakarta.

International career 
As a Nigerian, Greg does not have any record that he has been capped in any match for both junior or senior Nigeria National Football Team. In early 2010, Greg was rumoured that he will soon play for the Indonesia national football team, though this rumour wasn't confirmed by Greg himself, what is interesting is that he does not confirm nor deny the rumour. After many speculations, in August 2011 Football Association of Indonesia finally confirmed that Greg has been naturalised, and got Indonesian citizenship officially on 10 October 2011. He made his debut for the Indonesia national football team in the 2015 AFC Asian Cup qualification campaign against Saudi Arabia on 23 March 2013.

Career statistics

International

International goals
Scores and results list Indonesia's goal tally first.

Honours

Club
Tampines Rovers
 S.League: 2004
 Singapore Cup: 2004

Arema Cronus
 Menpora Cup: 2013

Controversies 
On 15 April 2014, after the Persipura Jayapura vs Persebaya Bhayangkara match conference, Greg got into a fight with Jacksen F. Tiago because of personal problems that started in the Indonesia national football team. The situation then eased after police restrained both of them.

Personal life 
On 20 May 2018, he married Indonesian model and actress Kimmy Jayanti, in Perth, Australia.

References

External links
 
 

1986 births
Living people
Sportspeople from Onitsha
Indonesian footballers
Indonesia international footballers
Nigerian footballers
Nigerian emigrants to Indonesia
Indonesian people of Nigerian descent
Association football forwards
Indonesian expatriate footballers
Warriors FC players
Expatriate footballers in Singapore
Liga 1 (Indonesia) players
Persija Jakarta players
S.C. Olhanense players
Pelita Jaya FC players
PSMS Medan players
Expatriate footballers in Portugal
Naturalised citizens of Indonesia
Expatriate footballers in Thailand
Nigerian expatriate sportspeople in Portugal